Masako Asada (born 8 January 1971) is a Japanese diver. She competed in two events at the 1988 Summer Olympics.

References

External links
 

1971 births
Living people
Japanese female divers
Olympic divers of Japan
Divers at the 1988 Summer Olympics
Asian Games medalists in diving
Divers at the 1990 Asian Games
Divers at the 1994 Asian Games
Asian Games bronze medalists for Japan
Medalists at the 1990 Asian Games
20th-century Japanese women